Sentimentalovers (also styled SENTIMENTALovers) is the sixth full-length album released by singer and songwriter Ken Hirai.  It was released on November 24, 2004 and sold over 1,660,885 copies.

Summary 
Sentimentalovers charted for 52 weeks. Hirai wrote the songs and also helped compose most of them.

Track listing 
思いがかさなるその前に･･･  (Omoi ga kasanaru sono mae ni...)
22nd single.
Jealousy
 21st single. (performed with Soulhead and Yoshika)
言わない関係 (Iwanai Kanke)
Piano in beginning performed by Ken Hirai.  Soffet helped in the chorus.
瞳をとじて (Hitomi wo Tojite)
20th single. This song was the theme song to the movie, "Socrates in Love" (世界の中心で、愛をさけぶ). The single was a #1 hit.
青春デイズ (Seishun Deizu)
Style
19th single.
Signal
This track is also on Ken's 19th single, "Style".
鍵穴 (Kagiana)
Nostalgia
キミはともだち (Kimi wa Tomodachi)
21st single. Sounds composed by Ken Hirai
センチメンタル (Senchimentaru)

Charts
Oricon Sales Chart (Japan)

2004 albums
Ken Hirai albums